Spencer Compton, 8th Earl of Northampton (16 August 1738 – 7 April 1796) was a British peer and Member of Parliament.

Northampton was the younger son of the Hon. Charles Compton, third son of George Compton, 4th Earl of Northampton and Mary Lucy. He was educated at Westminster School from 1746.

He was elected to the House of Commons for Northampton in 1761, a seat he held until 1763 when he succeeded his elder brother in the earldom and entered the House of Lords. He also served as a Groom of the Bedchamber to George III (1760–63), as Recorder of Northampton from 1763 to his death, and as Lord Lieutenant of Northamptonshire from 1771 to death.

Lord Northampton married Jane, daughter of Henry Lawton, in 1758. He died in April 1796, aged 57, and was succeeded in his titles by his son Charles, who was created Marquess of Northampton in 1812.

References

Source
Kidd, Charles, Williamson, David (editors). Debrett's Peerage and Baronetage (1990 edition). New York: St Martin's Press, 1990. 

1738 births
1796 deaths
British MPs 1761–1768
08
Spencer
Lord-Lieutenants of Northamptonshire
Compton, Spencer